Joyland is a neighborhood in Northeast Lexington, Kentucky, United States. Its boundaries are I-75/ I-64 to the south, Paris Pike to the east, Russell Cave Road to the west, and the Lexington Urban Growth Boundary to the north. Joyland is the only north Lexington neighborhood to be located entirely north of I-75.

Neighborhood statistics

 Area: 
 Population: 2,940
 Population density: 2,204 people per square mile (840/km2)
 Median household income: $43,095

References

Neighborhoods in Lexington, Kentucky